Viktor Beneš (born 1961) is a Czechoslovak-Slovak slalom canoeist who competed at the international level from 1984 to 1993.

He won four medals in the C2 team event at the ICF Canoe Slalom World Championships with a gold (1985) and two silvers (1987, 1991) for Czechoslovakia and a bronze (1993) for Slovakia.

His partner in the C2 boat from 1984 to 1989 was Ondřej Mohout. From 1991 to 1993 he paddled with Milan Kučera.

World Cup individual podiums

References

Czechoslovak male canoeists
Slovak male canoeists
Living people
1961 births
Medalists at the ICF Canoe Slalom World Championships